Danny Pink is a fictional character created by Steven Moffat and portrayed by Samuel Anderson in the long-running British science fiction television series Doctor Who. He is a supporting character in the eighth series of the program, first appearing in the second episode, "Into the Dalek". He appears alongside Peter Capaldi's Twelfth Doctor and his storylines stem primarily from being the colleague, and later boyfriend, of companion Clara Oswald, portrayed by Jenna Coleman. He appears in every episode of Series 8 except for the series premiere "Deep Breath" and the third episode "Robot of Sherwood".

Appearances
Danny Pink is first introduced in Series 8 Episode 2, "Into the Dalek". He is a new Maths teacher at Coal Hill Secondary School in London, and is reasonably new to the profession having spent a number of years in the past serving with the British Army. A dark past is hinted at when he avoids answering a question from one of his students on whether he has ever killed someone who wasn't a soldier, with a tear rolling down his cheek. He is instantly attracted to his new colleague, Clara Oswald (Jenna Coleman), an English teacher at the school, and attempts to ask her out on a date, which is at first disastrous, but she eventually asks him herself.

Their first date is seen in the fourth episode of the series, "Listen". Clara is offended when Danny presumes that she will not understand his career in the Army, knowing that she is anti-war, and she storms out. At the same time, the Doctor (Peter Capaldi) is attempting to explore the possibility that everyone has a constant companion, like a shadow, that is always with them, relating back to the recurring dream of the monster under the bed. Wanting to explore Clara's past experience of the dream, the TARDIS taps into her mind to return to her childhood but, as she is distracted by Danny, it takes them back to a children's home in Gloucester where they meet Danny as a child, whose real name is actually Rupert. Clara inadvertently inspires him to be a soldier.  She then returns to the present and goes back to the date immediately after she stormed out. She attempts to reconcile things with Danny, but he becomes suspicious when she reveals she knows his real name. This time, he storms out. Clara is then stunned when the Doctor takes her to meet Orson Pink, a time traveller from 100 years in the future who has become stranded at the end of the universe. Orson bears a striking resemblance to Danny (both are played by Samuel Anderson). Clara realises that Orson is Danny's descendant, and she contemplates the idea that he is also hers after he remarks that he is descended from a time traveller. Realising that her future lies with Danny, she visits him and they reconcile by sharing their first kiss.

In the season's sixth episode, "The Caretaker", a Skovox Blitzer is drawn to the school by the Doctor, who is posing as Coal Hill's caretaker. He clashes with Danny, mocking his past in the Army and refusing to accept that he is a Maths teacher, believing he is more suited to the role of a P.E. teacher (to the point of nicknaming him "P.E."). Clara struggles to balance her life with the Doctor and her relationship with Danny, especially as neither one knows about the other.  However, when Danny becomes suspicious of the Doctor's activities, he discovers the truth about Clara's time-travelling activities. Although he initially struggles to come to terms with the idea, he gives Clara his blessing to continue travelling, but warns her that there may come a time when the Doctor pushes her too far, remembering similar individuals from his time in the army.

Danny makes brief appearances in subsequent episodes in the series, and he supports Clara when she decides to stop travelling with the Doctor after he puts her in a vulnerable position in "Kill the Moon". However, Clara is unable to resist the temptation of time travelling and resumes her trips with the Doctor without telling Danny. Her deception is exposed in "In the Forest of the Night", when Clara, Danny and a group of special needs students become stranded in an overgrown central London and are forced to call on the Doctor for help. While inside the TARDIS, Danny discovers a pile of recent student papers Clara has been marking, proving she is in regular contact with the Doctor. He is unhappy with her dishonesty, and this creates a strain on their relationship.

Clara decides to declare her unending love for Danny in "Dark Water", but her phone call to him is cut short when Danny is hit by a car. She is devastated when he dies of his injuries, but Danny's consciousness is brought to the Nethersphere, an artificial afterlife created by Missy (Michelle Gomez), a female version of the long-standing Doctor Who villain the Master. Danny's past is explored when he is confronted with a young boy he killed while serving in Afghanistan. Upset over this and Clara's reaction to his death, Danny is encouraged to delete his emotions, but does not do so before seeing Missy force the consciousnesses trapped in the afterlife back to their bodies, which have been "upgraded" to become Cybermen. Danny rescues Clara from other Cybermen and asks her to turn on his emotional inhibitor to stop the pain he is under, both emotionally and physically, now he is a Cyberman. Clara convinces the Doctor to help her with this when Danny suggests he can access the hive mind of the Cybermen and discover Missy's plans for the Earth. He does so, but, due to his strong love for Clara, continues to act against Missy.  With the Doctor's aid, he uses a bracelet that previously belonged to Missy to take control of the other Cybermen and, under his command, they all fly into the sky and self-destruct. Still possessing Missy's bracelet, which has the power to make one trip out of the Nethersphere back into the real world, Clara begs him to come back, but he instead sends back the boy he killed, making Clara promise to return him to his family.  It is never revealed, that, with Danny's death, what happens to his descendant, Orson Pink.

Danny next appears in the 2014 Christmas special, "Last Christmas".  Having been put in a dream state, Clara is reunited with Danny for an idyllic Christmas Day. The Doctor enters the dream to convince Clara to wake up before the creature that induced the dream kills her, but she refuses, unwilling to let go of Danny.  "Danny" then reveals that he is aware of his 'reality' as a dream.  He tells Clara that, while she can still miss him, she must move on and encourages her to live her life without him.  Finally accepting his death, Clara agrees to wake up from the dream.

Danny is occasionally mentioned in the ninth series. In "The Magician's Apprentice", Missy asks Clara about her dead lover, referring to Danny. When Clara realises she is about to die in "Face the Raven", she states that if Danny Pink could face his own death, then so can she.

Casting and development
On 24 February 2014, Samuel Anderson was announced that he has been cast alongside Peter Capaldi and Jenna Coleman for Capaldi's first series as Danny Pink, a teacher at Coal Hill School alongside companion Clara Oswald. Coal Hill School was the workplace of original companions Ian Chesterton and Barbara Wright. Following 2013's 50th anniversary celebrations, head writer Steven Moffat decided that he would bring in another teacher to work alongside Clara in exploring the school's roots. Anderson said that he was "excited" about joining the show, and could not wait to see how his character would be involved with the Doctor and Clara. Despite it not being confirmed until shortly before Series 8's airing, it was commonly speculated that Anderson would be playing Clara's love interest. Coleman and Anderson had previously closely worked together on the ITV soap opera Emmerdale, where they played Jasmine Thomas and Ross Kirk respectively.

Anderson confirmed that Danny would be Clara's love interest in August 2014, but made it clear that Danny would not be a companion but rather the stay-at-home boyfriend providing Clara with the stability she needs after time travel. He also described Danny as "lovable and huggable". Danny's first appearance aired on 30 August 2014 in the second episode of the series, "Into the Dalek". Moffat described Danny as a "competitor" of the Doctor, saying that he had a better chance of winning Clara than previous companion boyfriends such as Mickey Smith and Rory Williams, who appeared weak compared to their Doctors.

The series finale two-parter "Dark Water"/"Death in Heaven" saw Danny's character killed off, not once, but twice. His past was also explored from The Nethersphere, an artificial afterlife where Danny was confronted with a child he killed while serving in the Afghanistan war. As part of the Mistress' plans, Danny was reincarnated as a Cyberman along with the other dead on Earth, but saved the day by taking control of the other Cybermen and leading them into the sky to explode and burn away clouds of Cyber spores meant to convert the living as well. Moffat was quoted as saying that the event "cemented" Danny's place in Doctor Who history.

Reception

Despite some initial outcry against another romantic interest for a companion, the character of Danny Pink and Anderson's portrayal of him were mostly positive following his first appearance. Malcolm Stewart of CultBox praised Danny for being starkly different from the characters of Rory Williams and Mickey Smith, who he claimed were "defined in relation to their girlfriends and... kept on a leash by their better sassier halves", and commented that, unlike them, Danny did not feel "emasculated" and was a more "straightforward, unassuming proposition".

The initial reception to his death in "Dark Water" was also positive, with the episode receiving five stars from the Telegraph. Michael Hogan of the paper said that Danny Pink was "finally coming into his own", and called Danny's flashbacks to the war as "joltingly emotional, lump in throat moments". However, his permanent death and continuation of story in the following story "Death in Heaven" received mixed reviews, with Doctor Who TV commenting that how Danny kept a grip of his emotions following the turning of his inhibitor not being a sufficient explanation and criticising that Danny's backstory was not given sufficient screen time for emotional impact. Following his death, some fans campaigned to "keep Danny dead" following Steven Moffat's apparent trend to resurrect fallen companions including Clara, and Rory Williams.

In 2015, Michael Hogan of The Daily Telegraph criticised the general portrayal of male companion figures in Doctor Who. He described Danny, alongside 2005-2006 character Mickey Smith (Noel Clarke) and 2010-2012 character Rory Williams (Arthur Darvill) as all "basically soppy, sappy, slightly annoying plus-ones to far superior females".

References

External links

Danny Pink at the BBC One Doctor Who website

Television characters introduced in 2014
Fictional schoolteachers
Fictional soldiers
Male characters in television
Recurring characters in Doctor Who
Fictional Black British people